

Narasinghpur 
Narasinghpur is part of the Baramba (Odisha Vidhan Sabha constituency) which includes Baramba block and Narasinghpur block. Sri Devi Prasad Mishra, MLA of the constituency is native of Narasinghpur.

Narasinghpur is named after its discoverer Narasingh who was later overthrown by Sri Mandardhar Harichandana Mohapatra. The small town has its own magnificent history. The local deity of the land is goddess "pragala".

Geography 

Narasinghpur is situated 100 km far from capital Bhubaneswar and 120 km far from its district headquarters Cuttack. Global positioning is at 20.467La/85.083Lo. One side of Narasinghpur is painted by the perennial giant Mahanadi River, where as the other side is escorted by the vast forest area with many mountains called Satakosia Wildlife Sanctuary.

This place is connecting to districts like Nayagarh district, Angul to its own Cuttack district.

History 

Narasinghpur was the capital of Narsinghpur State, a former princely state of India during the period of the British Raj. The state was also known as Arata Rajya. The kingdom was ruled by the Singhdev dynasty. The most renowned king was Sri Ananta Narayana Singhdev, who had got the title of Sandhamarka (means brave and efficient) by the Puri gajapati. He had also established the first high school in the block later named after him Ananta Narayana high school which once had a hostel. The last king of the state was Sri Trilochan Singhdev, who was also the first MLA of the constituency.

Rulers of Narasinghpur

 1671   –   1701 Mandardhar Harichandan Mohapatra
 1701   –   1723 Kochali Harichandan Mohapatra
 1723   –   1765 Biswambar Harichandan Mohapatra
 1765   –   1775 Rrishna Chandra Harichandan Mohapatra
 1775   –   1798 Nimai Charan Harichandan Mohapatra
 1798   –   1826 Jaganath Harichandan Mohapatra
 1826   –   1859 Somanath Harichandan Mohapatra
 1859   –   1884 Braja Sundar Harichandan Mohapatra
 4 Dec 1884 – 1912 Sadhu Charan Man Singh Harichandan (b. 1883 – d. ?) Mohapatra
 18 Jul 1912 – 5 Jul 1921 Ramchandra Man Singh Harichandan (b. 1906 – d. 1921) Mohapatra
 5 Jul 1921 – 15 Aug 1947 Ananta Narayan Man Singh (b. 1908 – d. 1963) Harichandan Mohapatra
 The last king Trilochan Mansingh Harichandana Mohapatra (Trilochan Singh dev), the elder son of Ananta narayana Singhdev became the first MLA of newly built Badamba-Narasinghpur constituency.

Tourism
Narasinghpur is known as a vibrant tourist place with its own charisma, pleasant ambiance and many tourist spots. It is also known as a 'temple town'. Here are few famous tourist places of the block.
 Deojhar Waterfall (ଦେଓଝର ଝରଣା)- This is the only waterfall in Cuttack district. The site is a  Odisha tourism recognized. There is another waterfall situated near to it named Dabarakhola waterfall, which has two levels. The upper level is a must visit for the adventurous tourists.
 Satakisia gorge (ସାତକୋଶିଆ ଗଣ୍ଡ)-An eco-tourism place surround by the Mahanadi river. It is the largest gorge in Odisha. The place is present inside the Satakosia tiger sanctuary.
 Maa pragala pitha (ପ୍ରଗଳା ପୀଠ).  This is the temple of the city deity Maa Pragala(ନରସିଂହପୁରର ଅଧୀଷ୍ଠାତ୍ରୀ ଦେବୀ ମା ପ୍ରଗଳା). Deep inside the forest the sacred place creates a spiritual and devotional environment. The place has local tribal villages and an Ashrama school in the vicinity. There is also a beautiful dam near to the temple, which is a famous picnic spot and receives active footfalls of tourists round the year.
 Baneswara Temple (ବାଣେଶ୍ୱର ମନ୍ଦିର)- Standing with spectacular carvings in the rock wall, The temple dedicated to Lord Shiva spreads the fragrance of spirituality and devotion. There is a legend behind the place. A Rakshasa named Banasura praised and impressed Lord Shiva here and built the temple.
 Rajabati (ରାଜବାଟୀ)- It's the Royal palace of Narasinghpur royal family. The now abandoned palace becomes colourful by visiotors during Ratha-Yatra, Kartika purnima, Pragala Yatra, and Ashtashambhu Yatra, etc.
 Budha Budhi Ghati (ବୁୁଢ଼ା ବୁୁଢୀ ଘାଟି)-It's a ravane on the Narasinghpur-Angul road. There is a viewpoint from where the view of majestic hill ranges and foggy cloudy sky is enough to sprout a sense of romance in you.
 Indra Bhawan(ଇନ୍ଦ୍ର ଭବନ)- It is the government guest house of the city. Surrounded by the green trees with a amazing view, the building lies on a small hill. The road to the building was made by cutting the hill. Cycling down the curved slope is very amusing. The energetic youths spend their leisure times here.
 Sisupathar dam(ଶିଶୁପଥର Dam) - A beautiful and large dam near the village sisupathar . A visitor can feel the rural calmness and enjoy the scenic beauty of the dam especially during the rainy and winter days. 
Champanathadeva temple (ଚମ୍ପାନାଥଦେବ ମନ୍ଦିର)- A Shiva temple in the village of champeswara named after the deity. Here the Shiva lingam is west facing in contradictory to east facing lingams in Hindu tradition. The temple, as in most Shiva temples, has a pond that is home to a large number of tortoises.
Vishvanatha Temple (ବିଶ୍ୱନାଥ ମନ୍ଦିର)- Lying on a hill platform, the Shiva temple attracts the attention of city. The temple is accompanied by a Hanuman temple at the back side which has an inclined large rock surface from which the observer gets a 360° view of the town with its scenic coconut trees and the smiling Mahanadi river. The temple is lit during Maha Shivaratri.
Jagannath Temple (ଜଗନ୍ନାଥ ମନ୍ଦିର)- The temple is dedicated to Lord Jagannath. The temple has a small Shiva temple with Shiva lingam which is auto - arisen (ଫୁଟାଲିଂଗ) from the earth. The campus has also an widow home. This temple has a different type of architecture than usual temples.
Raghunatha Temple(ରଘୁନାଥ ମନ୍ଦିର)- It is the temple of Shri Rama. Every year Ramleela (drama of Ramayana) is performed here where people spend sleepless spring nights by watching the drama on the temple Natyamandapa.
Ashtashambhu Temples (ଅଷ୍ଟଶମ୍ଭୁ ମନ୍ଦିର)- These are other Shiva temples of the area. There is a festival of this area named Ashtashambhu Yatra celebrated in spring when all the Shambhus (Shiva) meet at a place and then march for the Rajabati (Royal Palace). This a festival where reunion of eight auto - arisen Shambhus(ଫୁଟାଲିଂଗ) and other shiv temple Shambhus happens, which is one of its unique in Odisha to be believed.
 Gopinatha Matha (ଗୋପୀନାଥ ମଠ)
 Maa Baseli Temple (ମା ବାସେଳି ମନ୍ଦିର). This temple dedicated to goddess Baseli situated near village Baselihata.

Dayasambhu Parbata (ଦୟାଶମ୍ଭୁ   ପର୍ବତ)-A holy Place of Lord  Shiva Estd. By  Dayanidhi Paramahansa Dev

Culture 
The temple town Narasinghpur has a rich historical culture. The town had been the centre of monarchial rule during Gadajaat Odisha. As being under direct influence of the king the town had been celebrating Vijayadashami, Ratha Yatra, Holi, Ramleela, Astashambhu Yatra, Maha Shivaratri, Shitalashasthi, Ganesha puja, Saraswati puja, Prgala yatra, Kumar purnima, Gajalaxmi puja, Vishvakarma puja, hanuman jayanti, Diwali, Kali puja, Chhadakhai Yatra.

The Astasambhu yatra is a festival indigenous to the area celebrated generally in Spring: Odia-Phalguna (ଫାଲଗୁନ). This is similar to Melana in other parts of Odisha. In  the  sitting on  travel from village to village from homes to homes bestowing blessings upon the devotees. People pray the shambhus with offering flowers, Prasāda, lighting earthen lamps and fragrance sticks. The night sky is paroxytoned in the sounds of e.g., Dhola and Ghanta. The unition ground becomes sacred and the devotees offer their devotion to the deities. The chants of mantras creates a spiritual environment. The breeze blows carrying, along with it, the smells of flowers. The people become overwhelmed with the shiva naama and bhajans. After the gathering of all  they together march towards the rajabati, king's palace in the crowd of devotees with the sounds of ghanta-ghantaa. There Lord Vishnu comes out of his temple in the royal campus and a function is held which is called hara-hari milana (ହର ହରି ମିଳନ).''

From the famous occasion of Chhadakhai Narasighpur Mahosthav(also famously known as Chhadakhai Jatra) is celebrated, which is usually continues for seven to nine days. Hundreds of vendors open their stalls and several amusement activities, melody/musical and stand-up nights are organized in the famous chhadakhai padia near Narasighpur police station. This is a festival every Narasighpuria waits throughout the year to cherish.

Gallery

References

Cuttack district
Tourist attractions in Cuttack district